Marisa Cortesi (born 3 June 1970) is a Swiss former equestrian. She competed in the individual eventing at the 2004 Summer Olympics.

References

External links
 

1970 births
Living people
Swiss female equestrians
Olympic equestrians of Switzerland
Equestrians at the 2004 Summer Olympics
People from Chur
Sportspeople from Graubünden